C. J. Faison (born August 31, 1993) is an American entrepreneur and former professional stock car racing driver. The Felton, Delaware native currently serves as general manager of auction company Delaware Auto Exchange and has competed in the NASCAR Xfinity Series and Camping World Truck Series, among other series.

Business career
Faison's business career started at the age of seven, sweeping floors at his father Ronald's business, Delaware Auto Exchange. C. J. took over the auction company at age 22 from his father and saw growth due to connecting with a younger demographic. Faison also serves on the board of directors of the National Association of Public Auto Auctions. Other business ventures include a mixed martial arts series, a sunglasses company and a shock manufacturing company.

Racing career

Grassroots series
Faison's racing career began at the age of four in the go-kart ranks; he later moved up to dirt sprint cars around the Delaware area.

K&N Pro Series East
In 2011, Faison attempted four races and made three in this series. In his first attempt, at South Boston Speedway, Faison failed to qualify in Rich Rudolph's No. 02 Chevrolet. For the next race, at Richmond International Raceway, Faison qualified 32nd and finished in that same place in what would be his last race for Rudolph. Faison returned eight races later in a family-owned team. At New Hampshire Motor Speedway, he qualified 35th but finished 34th after engine problems ended his race 45 laps in. In his final appearance of the season, again with his family-owned team, he qualified fourth at Dover International Speedway, a track only 14 miles away from his hometown. Once again, however, mechanical issues ended his day, as a broken shock relegated him to a 24th-place finish. In 2012, Faison logged a career-high nine starts, all for his family-owned team. With backing from Generation Rescue and Little Caesars Pizza, he logged a pole, two top-ten finishes, and two crashes. In 2013, Faison picked up backing from Sherwin-Williams, and recorded one top five finish and one crash in six starts. He led the most laps at Dover International Speedway before blowing a tire in the late portion of the race. After the race, Faison stated that winning at Dover is his "only goal in life".

Camping World Truck Series
In 2013, Faison made his Truck debut at Dover with SS-Green Light Racing, but a crash after 61 laps ended his day. His other start in that season was at Kentucky, in SS-Green Light's No. 81 truck. He finished 19th, one lap off the pace. A deal to drive Premium Motorsports' No. 94 truck in 2015 fell through. In 2016, Faison returned to SS-Green Light Racing, piloting the No. 07 truck at Dover to a 25th-place finish, 10 laps down. The opportunity came after Dotter called Faison earlier in the week to drive, hoping to keep the truck's position in owner points.

Xfinity Series
Faison debuted in the Xfinity Series in 2015, driving JGL Racing's No. 26 Toyota Camry at Dover. He started 37th and finished 23rd.

Motorsports career results

NASCAR
(key) (Bold – Pole position awarded by qualifying time. Italics – Pole position earned by points standings or practice time. * – Most laps led.)

Xfinity Series

Camping World Truck Series

 Season still in progress
 Ineligible for series points

References

External links
 

1993 births
Living people
People from Kent County, Delaware
NASCAR drivers
Racing drivers from Delaware
American businesspeople
American YouTubers
Video bloggers
YouTube vloggers